Choupette (born 15 August 2011) is a blue-cream tortie Birman
cat which was the pet of German fashion designer
Karl Lagerfeld from around Christmas 2011 until Lagerfeld's death on 19 February 2019 at the age of 85.

Originally belonging to the French model Baptiste Giabiconi, Choupette was given as a gift to Lagerfeld around Christmas 2011 following a stay with the designer while Giabiconi was abroad. "When he came back I thought I'm sorry Choupette is mine," said Lagerfeld.

Following Lagerfeld's death, there has been resulting confusion over which is the "real" Choupette page. Choupette's personal account, @ChoupetteOfficiel, was only created after Lagerfeld's death. Whereas, her first media appearance was made via the social networking service Twitter on 16 January 2012, on @ChoupettesDiary, a fan page by Ashley Schudin. In an interview with Making It In Manhattan, Schudin explains, "The Twitter account was originally created as a joke and playful satire for what the people believe the fashion industry is really like." Schudin explains, "In the past 2 years, it has increasingly become more challenging since Karl Lagerfeld’s team is not directly involved in my brand and therefore, I am not provided assets regularly. It is often a struggle to get original content when I don’t have direct access to Choupette."

With Choupette's social media presence and multiple 'interviews' in high-end fashion magazines, her celebrity has grown, having prompted Lagerfeld to have remarked "People are stunned by her ... Soon people will talk more about Choupette than about me!" , she has more than 46,000 fans on the Twitter account invented in her honor.

In June 2013, Lagerfeld announced that he wished to marry Choupette. He said in an interview with CNN, "There is no marriage, yet, for human beings and animals… I never thought that I would fall in love like this with a cat."

Following Lagerfeld's death in February 2019, speculation ran rampant that the feline would inherit part of the late designer's fortune, as in fact the German born couturier once told Le Figaro that (Choupette) "has her own little fortune. She is an heiress”.

Online personality 
Choupette's personal page, @ChoupetteOfficiel, created after Lagerfeld's death, shows the cat in her home, playing, and living a happy cat life.

Choupette's fan page personality, @ChoupettesDiary, "was created originally as a joke and playful satire for what people believe the fashion industry is really like." As such, it is one of a fierce, high-maintenance, spoiled madam, presumably an amalgamation of the various stereotypical character traits and eccentricities surrounding individuals in the fashion industry, not least of Lagerfeld himself. Among her particularities is her use of the Apple iPad, her quoted 'choice' to eat at table next to Lagerfeld, and her love of antique lace, Colette shopping bags and Goyard.

She has two "beloved" maids, Françoise and Marjorie, who tend to Choupette (a task that includes taking care of her hair and other beauty jobs) and keep a diary of her activities and moods for the reference of Lagerfeld and an on-call vet. Of the two maids, Choupette is said to prefer Françoise.

Use in fashion 

Internet rumours of a Choupette-inspired Chanel handbag first appeared in early July 2012 following a tweet by the New York Times' Cathy Horyn. It was speculated that the Choupette was the bag carried by models in Lagerfeld's Fall 2012 Couture show, though this was never confirmed. Choupette has also been credited as the inspiration behind Lagerfeld's cornflower blue Spring 2012 Couture collection (he has described her eyes as "blue, blue, blue, blue, blue"), but given the timing of Choupette's adoption by Lagerfeld and the timescale of the design process, this claim is unlikely to be true.

Choupette has appeared in photoshoots (most famously with Laetitia Casta in a 10-page editorial in V magazine in September 2012). Lagerfeld was early to dismiss the possibility of her modelling work extending beyond his own projects, stating simply "I'm commercial; she's not".

, a book, Choupette, was slated for release, as was a capsule makeup collection by Shu Uemura.

In March 2015, Lagerfeld said in an interview with The Cut, that Choupette had earned €3 million  ($3.18 million USD) during 2014 from participating in two projects: one for cars in Germany, and the other for a Shu Uemura's Shupette beauty product in Japan.

See also 
Human–animal marriage
List of individual cats
List of wealthiest animals

References 

2011 animal births
Individual cats